Brushy may refer to:

 Brushy, Oklahoma, United States, a census-designated place
 Brushy Mountains (disambiguation) or Mountain, various mountains in the United States
 Brushy Peak, California, United States
 Brushy Butte, California
 Brushy Lake (Sallisaw, Oklahoma), United States, a reservoir
 Brushy Creek (disambiguation), various creeks in the United States and one in Australia
 Brushy Branch, a stream in Missouri, United States
 Brushy Fork (Tavern Creek tributary), Missouri, United States
 Brushy Fork (Pauls Creek tributary), North Carolina, United States
 Brushy Fork, West Virginia, United States - see Brushy Fork Coal Impoundment

See also
 Brushy Bill Roberts (1879–1950), a man who claimed to be the outlaw Billy the Kid